Headstart is an Israeli crowdfunding site for entrepreneurs.  It was founded by Yossi Meiri and Yonatan Gal. They were inspired by Kickstarter.

See also
Comparison of crowd funding services

References 

Crowdfunding platforms of Israel